Nine ships of the French Navy have borne the name Lys after the Lilium, a flower featured in the arms of France as the Fleur-de-lis:

 , a 54-gun ship of the line, was started as Lys, and became Assuré from 1771.
 , a 70-gun ship of the line
 , a  84-gun ship of the line
 , a 70-gun ship of the line
 , a 64-gun ship of the line, lead ship of her class
  (1780), a corvette, captured by the Royal Navy the year of her launching.
 , a  74-gun ship of the line. She was started as Commerce de Marseille, and also bore the name Tricolore from 1792
 , a Téméraire-class 74-gun ship of the line, became Lys in 1814 at the Bourbon Restoration
 , a 90-gun ship of the line, was started as Lys in 1825, was renamed Ulm in 1830 after the July Revolution, and completed as a steam ship in 1854.

French Navy ship names